Isaabad or Isabad or Isi Abad may refer to various places in Iran:
 Isaabad, Chaharmahal and Bakhtiari
 Isaabad, Kerman
 Isaabad, Rafsanjan, Kerman Province
 Isaabad, Kurdistan
 Isaabad, Sarab Qamish, Kurdistan Province
 Isaabad, Markazi
 Isaabad, Qom
 Isaabad, Dalgan, Sistan and Baluchestan Province